In Greek mythology, King Coronaeus (Ancient Greek: Κορωναῖος) of Phocis was the father of Corone, who was changed into a crow by Athena as she fled from Poseidon.

See also
List of Greek mythological figures

Note

Kings of Phocis

References 

 Publius Ovidius Naso, Metamorphoses translated by Brookes More (1859-1942). Boston, Cornhill Publishing Co. 1922. Online version at the Perseus Digital Library.
 Publius Ovidius Naso, Metamorphoses. Hugo Magnus. Gotha (Germany). Friedr. Andr. Perthes. 1892. Latin text available at the Perseus Digital Library.

Kings in Greek mythology
Phocian characters in Greek mythology